Coleophora paripennella is a moth of the family Coleophoridae. It is found in most of Europe, except the Iberian Peninsula and Balkan Peninsula.

The wingspan is 10–13 mm. Adults are metallic bronze with white-tipped dark antennae. Coleophora species have narrow blunt to pointed forewings and a weakly defined tornus. The hindwings are narrow-elongate and very long-fringed. The upper surfaces have neither a discal spot nor transverse lines. Each abdomen segment of the abdomen has paired patches of tiny spines which show through the scales. The resting position is horizontal with the front end raised and the cilia give the hind tip a frayed and upturned look if the wings are rolled around the body. C. paripennella characteristics include:- Head shining greyish bronze. Antennae dark fuscous, apex white. Forewings rather dark fuscous, more or less bronzy-shining. Hindwings dark grey.

They are on wing from July to August.

The larvae feed on Arctium, Arnica, Carduus, Carlina, Centaurea jacea, Centaurea nigra, Cirsium arvense, Saussurea, Serratula tinctoria and Solidago species. Full-grown larva live in a blackish brown trivalved tubular silken case of about 8 mm. The mouth angle is 0°-10°, causing the case to lie almost flat on the leaf. Full-grown larvae can be from the end of May to early June.

References

External links

  Bestimmungshilfe für die in Europa nachgewiesenen Schmetterlingsarten

paripennella
Moths described in 1839
Moths of Europe
Taxa named by Philipp Christoph Zeller